Meri-Rastila (Finnish), Havsrastböle (Swedish) is an eastern neighborhood of Helsinki, Finland.

Politics
Results of the 2011 Finnish parliamentary election in Meri-Rastila:

Social Democratic Party   22.1%
True Finns   21.4%
National Coalition Party   15.2%
Green League   14.2%
Left Alliance   12.4%
Centre Party   4.1%
Swedish People's Party   4.0%
Christian Democrats   3.7%

Vuosaari